Larry Burns may refer to: 

 Larry Burns (1911–1983), Northern Irish actor, appeared in Count Five and Die
 Larry Burns, Canadian hockey player, played in 1960 Memorial Cup
 Larry Burns (General Motors) (21st century), American executive for General Motors
 Larry Alan Burns (born 1954), U.S. federal judge 
 Larry Burns (The Simpsons), fictional character